The AMVCA Industry Merit Award is an honorary award presented by MultiChoice through Africa Magic for lifetime contribution to the development of African cinema.

Awards

List of Awardees

2013 Africa Magic Viewers Choice Awards 
 Olu Jacobs

2014 Africa Magic Viewers Choice Awards 
 Pete Edochie

2015 Africa Magic Viewers Choice Awards 
 Amaka Igwe

2016 Africa Magic Viewers Choice Awards 
 Bukky Ajayi
 Sadiq Daba

2017 Africa Magic Viewers Choice Awards 
 Chika Okpala

References 

Lifetime achievement awards
Industry Merit